CSTD may refer to:

Commission on Science and Technology for Development
Closed system drug transfer device